is a Japanese multinational holding company which focused on confectionery and ice cream processing, hotels and sport management. The company was founded in June 1948 by Korean businessman Shin Kyuk-ho.

It is the third largest confectionery manufacturer in Japan behind Meiji Seika and Ezaki Glico in terms of sales revenue.

External links 
  
  

Japanese companies established in 1948
Food and drink companies established in 1948
Food and drink companies of Japan
Food and drink companies based in Tokyo
Holding companies based in Tokyo
Japanese chocolate companies
Multinational companies headquartered in Japan
Japanese brands
Lotte Corporation
Midori-kai
Snack food manufacturers of Japan
Holding companies established in 1948